Muhammad Shah (born Awang Alak Betatar) established the Sultanate of Brunei and was its first sultan, possibly from 1363 to 1402. The genealogy of Muhammad Shah is unclear, and is based on several historical sources and legends.

Biography
The early life of Muhammad Shah is unknown. The current Sultanate of Brunei was formed by Muhammad Shah, with the help of his brothers Awang Pateh Berbai (also known as Ahmad of Brunei, the second Sultan of Brunei) and Awang Semaun. He ruled from 1368 to his death in 1402. He ruled as Raja Awang Alak Betatar until the early 1360s, at which point he converted to Islam to marry the daughter of the King of Temasik (Old Singapore, known as that time in Brunei as Johor).

Muhammad Shah died in 1402, and was succeeded by Sultan Abdul Majid Hassan.

It is unclear whom Muhammad Shah married, but it is reported either as the daughter of Iskandar Shah, or the daughter of Sang Nila Utama, both of the House of Sang Sapurba.

It was noted that Muhammad Shah founded the Sultanate. He sent a mission to China in 1371; the Ming Shih (Book 325), a contemporaneous Chinese reference book, noted that the King of Brunei in 1370 was Ma-ho-mo-sa. Local Brunei historians take this to refer to "Muhammad Shah" the first Islamic Sultan of Brunei, however others take it to read as "Mahmud Shah". Another viewpoint is that Ma-ho-mo-sa could be pronounced as "Maha Moksha", which means Great Eternity, a Buddhist name; this is in keeping by the Chinese record of his successor also having a Buddhist name.

His daughter, Princess Ratna Dewi, allegedly married a Chinese immigrant by the name of Ong Sum Ping also named Ong Sum Ping who started a trading station at Mumiang on the Kinabatangan River. For this he was conferred the nobility title of Pengiran Maharaja Lela and elected Chief of Kinabatangan.

There is evidence that there was an Islamic presence in the current area of Brunei before the current Sultanate - there is evidence that there was also a pre-existing Muslim dynasty in the area.

See also
 List of Sultans of Brunei

References

External links
 Sultan - Sultan Brunei

Sultans of Brunei
1402 deaths